XTC released 12 original albums and over 30 singles for Virgin Records, between 1977 and 1992. They signed to Cooking Vinyl for their final two albums in 1999 and 2000.

Albums

Studio albums

Live albums

Compilation albums

Other albums

Extended plays

Singles

Music videos

See also
 The Dukes of Stratosphear
 A Testimonial Dinner: The Songs of XTC 
 Left of the Dial: Dispatches from the '80s Underground

References

External links
 XTC Discography at chalkhills.org

XTC
New wave discographies
Pop music group discographies
Discography